The Port Stanley School is located on Lopez Island, in the San Juan Islands (San Juan County), Washington, in the United States. It was listed on the U.S. National Register of Historic Places in 1994. The building was restored in 2003 and currently serves as an exhibit of the Lopez Island Historical Society and community space.

History 
The Port Stanley School was first constructed in 1876 in the style of a rough log cabin, however no photos of this building are currently known to exist. In 1888, a lumber-framed second version of the school had been built to replace the previous building. When constructed, it was a single room school house accommodating a class of 25 children.
In 1917, Lee Norderer (a then recent graduate of Seattle's Lincoln High School) designed and had constructed the craftsman-styled third version of the Port Stanley School. This version of the school was in use until the Lopez Island School districts consolidated in 1941. The building was left vacant and mostly unused until it was donated to the Lopez Island Historical Society by Christopher and Helena Jones's family in December 1994. In 1996 restoration work began and continued until 2005.

It is a one-story school building which had a cloakroom, a single classroom, and, per its National Register nomination, a room at the rear for a teacher's office and library. Per a plan of the school available at the Lopez Island Historical Society and Museum website, the rear room was a second classroom.

References 

National Register of Historic Places in San Juan County, Washington
School buildings completed in 1888
Schools in San Juan County, Washington
School buildings completed in 1917
School buildings completed in 1876
Educational institutions established in 1876
1917 establishments in Washington (state)
1888 establishments in Washington Territory
School buildings on the National Register of Historic Places in Washington (state)
1876 establishments in Washington Territory
Defunct schools in Washington (state)